Emmy Wyda (2 March 1876 – 22 January 1942) was a German actress. She appeared in more than eighty films from 1913 to 1941.

Selected filmography

References

External links 

1876 births
1942 deaths
German film actresses
German silent film actresses
20th-century German actresses
Actresses from Gdańsk